Stathis Stasi (born 19 April 1973) is a Cypriot middle-distance runner. He competed in the men's 3000 metres steeplechase at the 2000 Summer Olympics.

References

1973 births
Living people
Athletes (track and field) at the 2000 Summer Olympics
Cypriot male middle-distance runners
Cypriot male steeplechase runners
Olympic athletes of Cyprus
Athletes (track and field) at the 1997 Mediterranean Games
World Athletics Championships athletes for Cyprus
Place of birth missing (living people)
Mediterranean Games competitors for Cyprus